Maria Vlakhou (born 8 August 1973) is a Greek sailor. She competed in the Europe event at the 2000 Summer Olympics.

References

External links
 

1973 births
Living people
Greek female sailors (sport)
Olympic sailors of Greece
Sailors at the 2000 Summer Olympics – Europe
Place of birth missing (living people)